Piezia is a genus of beetles in the family Carabidae, containing the following species:

 Piezia algoensis Peringuey, 1896 
 Piezia alternata Burgeon, 1929 
 Piezia angulata Burgeon, 1929 
 Piezia angusticollis Boheman, 1848 
 Piezia apicemaculata Basilewsky, 1981 
 Piezia aptinoides Perroud, 1846 
 Piezia axillaris Brulle, 1834 
 Piezia beirensis Burgeon, 1929 
 Piezia emarginata Fairmaire, 1887 
 Piezia kuntzeni Burgeon, 1929 
 Piezia licita Peringuey, 1899 
 Piezia livingstoni Chaudoir, 1870 
 Piezia mashuna Peringuey, 1896 
 Piezia pilosevittata J.Thomson, 1857 
 Piezia quinquesignata Fairmaire, 1887 
 Piezia selousi Peringuey, 1896 
 Piezia spinolae (Bertoloni, 1849) 
 Piezia suturata Burgeon, 1929

References

Lebiinae